Evergestis perobliqualis is a moth in the family Crambidae. It was described by George Hampson in 1906. It is found in Tibet, China.

References

Evergestis
Moths described in 1906
Moths of Asia